The HAIR-AN syndrome is a rare subtype of polycystic ovary syndrome (PCOS) characterized by hyperandrogenism (HA), insulin resistance (IR) and acanthosis nigricans (AN). The symptoms of the HAIR-AN syndrome are largely due to severe insulin resistance, which can be secondary to blocking antibodies against the insulin receptor or genetically absent/reduced insulin receptor number/function. Insulin resistance leads to hyperinsulinemia which, in turn, leads to an excess production of androgen hormones by the ovaries. High levels of androgen hormones (hyperandrogenism) in females causes excessive hair growth, acne and irregular menstruation. Patients with both underlying mechanisms of insulin resistance may have more severe hyperandrogenism. Insulin resistance is also associated with diabetes, heart disease and excessive darkening of the skin (acanthosis nigricans)

Signs and symptoms 
Obesity is the chief symptom of HAIR-AN. In the majority of young women affected by HAIR-AN, hyperandrogenism leads to oily skin, acne, hirsutism, menstrual irregularities and, in some cases, androgenic alopecia, clitoromegaly, changes in muscle mass and deepening of the voice. Insulin resistance can be accompanied by normal or elevated levels of glucose. Symptoms of diabetes such as polydipsia, polyuria and weight loss may sometimes be present.

Causes 
The causes of the HAIR-AN syndrome are not fully understood. Some studies hypothesize that the HAIR-AN syndrome is caused by a combination of genetic and environmental factors. HAIR-AN is found in 1-3% women affected hyperandrogenism. Other studies have proposed the SAHA syndrome as a cause of the HAIR-AN syndrome.

Diagnosis 
The diagnosis of HAIR-AN is based on identifying the symptoms and correlating them to the known risk factors.

The severity of hirsutism which accompanies the HAIR-AN syndrome has been found to correlate to the activity of the stromal ovarian cells, as they are overstimulated by elevated insulin levels.

Treatment 
The treatment is based on addressing obesity, thus reducing insulin resistance and its undesired effects. Insulin resistance can be treated with metformin and may have a positive impact on reproductive function.

Pharmacological treatment by suppression of gonadotropin with estrogen-progesterone oral contraceptives can reduce the hyperandrogenism by decreasing LH (leutinizing hormone) levels. Even their sex hormone binding to globulin increase is also responsible for decreasing body's bio-availability of testosterone. Progestin treatment with desogestrel and norgestimate appears to have fewer androgenic side effects and may be safer to use in persons with abnormal lipid levels or hirsutism. Other proposed treatments include antiandrogenic medications, spironolactone (in combination with oral contraceptives to prevent menstrual cycle irregularities), flutamide, and the 5α-reductase inhibitor finasteride.

See also 
 SAHA syndrome
 Skin lesion
 List of cutaneous conditions

References 

Endocrine gonad disorders